Laycock is an English surname, likely originating from the placename Lacock, in Wiltshire (which is pronounced Laycock) or Laycock in West Yorkshire.

According to the 1990 United States Census, Laycock is the 22,119th most common surname.

Notable people with this surname include:
Bill Laycock, Australian rugby union player
Craven Laycock, dean of Dartmouth College, 1911–1934
David Laycock, English cricketer
Donald Laycock, Australian linguist and anthropologist
Donald Laycock (artist), Australian artist
Douglas Laycock, American law professor
Elias C. Laycock, Australian rower
Fred Laycock, English footballer
Gloria Laycock, British criminologist
Henry Laycock, American politician
Jason Laycock, Australian footballer
Jimmye Laycock, American college football coach
John Laycock, English rock climber and Singaporean lawyer
John Laycock (Australian politician), an Australian politician
Joseph Frederick Laycock, British soldier and Olympian
Malcolm Laycock (1938–2009), British radio presenter and producer
Mitsuki Laycock, Japanese-American singer-songwriter 
Robert Laycock, World War II British commando
Robert Laycock (MP), English politician
Samuel Laycock, English poet
Scott Laycock, Australian  golfer
Steve Laycock, Canadian curler
Stuart Laycock, British historian
Thomas Laycock, English soldier and explorer
Thomas Laycock (physiologist), English physiologist

See also
Lacock (disambiguation)
Leacock (disambiguation)

References

English toponymic surnames